Ernest Winter (4 February 1910 – fourth ¼ 1970) was an English professional rugby league footballer who played in the 1930s.

Background
Ernest Winter's birth was registered in Pontefract district, West Riding of Yorkshire, and his death aged 60 was registered in Pontefract district, West Riding of Yorkshire, England.

Playing career

International honours
Ernest Winter won a cap for England while at Featherstone Rovers in 1933 against Other Nationalities.

County honours
Ernest Winter won caps for Yorkshire while at Featherstone Rovers; during the 1932–33 season against Cumberland and Lancashire.

Championship final appearances
Ernest Winter played left-, i.e. number 4, and scored a try in Hunslet's 8-2 victory over Leeds in the Championship Final during the 1937–38 season at Elland Road, Leeds on Saturday 30 April 1938.

Club career
Ernest Winter made his début for Featherstone Rovers on Saturday 1 March 1930.

References

External links

1910 births
1970 deaths
England national rugby league team players
English rugby league players
Featherstone Rovers players
Hunslet F.C. (1883) players
Rugby league centres
Rugby League XIII players
Rugby league players from Pontefract
Yorkshire rugby league team players